Anton Johannsen (April 29, 1872 – ?) was a German-born carpenter, anarchist, and labor activist who was indicted for the Los Angeles Times bombing.

In 1933, he was appointed by a Democratic governor to the States' Industrial Commission, and in 1935 received his highest status serving as Vice President of the Chicago Federation of Labor.

References

1872 births
1929 deaths
American anarchists
American carpenters
American trade unionists of German descent
Chicago Federation of Labor people
German anarchists
German emigrants to the United States
People from Clinton, Iowa
Trade unionists from California
United Brotherhood of Carpenters and Joiners of America people